The 1958 Jacksonville State Gamecocks football team represented Jacksonville State College (now known as Jacksonville State University) as a member of the Alabama Intercollegiate Conference (AIC) during the 1958 NAIA football season. Led by 12th-year head coach Don Salls, the Gamecocks compiled an overall record of 5–4 with a mark of 2–0 in conference play.

Schedule

References

Jacksonville State
Jacksonville State Gamecocks football seasons
Jacksonville State Gamecocks football